Molla Karim-e Bar Ahui (also Romanized as Mollā Karīm-e Bar Āhū’ī) is a village in Margan Rural District, in the Central District of Hirmand County, Sistan and Baluchestan Province, Iran. At the 2006 census, its population was 31, in 7 families.

References 

Populated places in Hirmand County